Plevna is an unincorporated community in northeastern Madison County, Alabama, United States. Residents of Plevna have New Market addresses.

History
Plevna is named in honor of Pleven, Bulgaria, which was a site of strategic importance during the Russo-Turkish War (1877–78). A post office operated under the name Plevna from 1878 to 1955.

References

Unincorporated communities in Alabama
Unincorporated communities in Madison County, Alabama
Huntsville-Decatur, AL Combined Statistical Area